The East Coast Environmental Law Association (ECELAW) is a non-profit organization that responds to community inquiries, carries out legal and policy research, and presents educational resources and opportunities to increase public awareness of environmental laws in Atlantic Canada.
 
Established in 2007, ECELAW's goal is to build capacity in the public and among legal practitioners so that they can work together to ensure that environmental laws are effectively used and strengthened.
 
Through its workshops, inquiry line and projects, ECELAW's work touches on a variety of wide-ranging issues of lasting public importance including water, fisheries, mining, energy, protected places, species at risk, and environmental assessment.

References 

Legal organizations based in Nova Scotia
Environmental law in Canada